Marion Ross Fedrick is the current president of Albany State University. She was appointed in 2018, having had been the interim president since 2017. She is a graduate of the University of Georgia.

References

Albany State University people
Heads of universities and colleges in the United States
Women academics
Year of birth missing (living people)
Living people
University of Georgia alumni